Football Club Asenovets are a Bulgarian association football club based in Asenovgrad, Plovdiv Province, currently playing in the South-East Third League, the third level of Bulgarian football. Their home ground since 1949 has been Shipka Stadium. Known for its highly motivated supporters even in lower divisions.

Current squad
As of 1 September 2015

Shipka stadium
Shipka stadium is a multi-use stadium in Asenovgrad, Bulgaria. It is currently used mostly for football matches and is the home ground of F.C. Asenovets. The stadium holds 3,852 people.

References

External links
Official site

Asenovets
Asenovgrad
1922 establishments in Bulgaria